Mohammad Ali Vakili is an Iranian journalist and reformist politician who is currently a member of the Parliament of Iran representing Tehran, Rey, Shemiranat and Eslamshahr electoral district.

Vakili is licenceholder and managing director of Ebtekar newspaper.

Career

Electoral history

References

1965 births
Living people
People from Kohgiluyeh and Boyer-Ahmad Province
Iranian newspaper publishers (people)
Members of the 10th Islamic Consultative Assembly
Volunteer Basij personnel of the Iran–Iraq War